Stanmore Bay is a suburb and beach located on the Whangaparaoa Peninsula, in the Auckland Region of New Zealand. The beach is on the northern side of the peninsula.

The area was named Stanmore by Walter James Hill son of Henry Hill who emigrated to New Zealand in 1853, because it reminded the family of Stanmore, England where they came from. The Hill family purchased 500 acres to farm but because it was only accessible by boat, they found it difficult to pursue farming there.

Demographics

Stanmore Bay had a population of 12,165 at the 2018 New Zealand census, an increase of 1,059 people (9.5%) since the 2013 census, and an increase of 2,001 people (19.7%) since the 2006 census. There were 4,401 households, comprising 5,976 males and 6,198 females, giving a sex ratio of 0.96 males per female, with 2,424 people (19.9%) aged under 15 years, 2,340 (19.2%) aged 15 to 29, 5,598 (46.0%) aged 30 to 64, and 1,800 (14.8%) aged 65 or older.

Ethnicities were 88.7% European/Pākehā, 10.6% Māori, 2.8% Pacific peoples, 7.2% Asian, and 2.3% other ethnicities. People may identify with more than one ethnicity.

The percentage of people born overseas was 28.7, compared with 27.1% nationally.

Although some people chose not to answer the census's question about religious affiliation, 54.1% had no religion, 34.5% were Christian, 0.3% had Māori religious beliefs, 1.2% were Hindu, 0.4% were Muslim, 0.7% were Buddhist and 1.8% had other religions.

Of those at least 15 years old, 2,070 (21.3%) people had a bachelor's or higher degree, and 1,458 (15.0%) people had no formal qualifications. 2,097 people (21.5%) earned over $70,000 compared to 17.2% nationally. The employment status of those at least 15 was that 5,160 (53.0%) people were employed full-time, 1,485 (15.2%) were part-time, and 300 (3.1%) were unemployed.

Education
The college opened at the beginning of 2005, incorporating Hibiscus Coast Intermediate School. It was initially called Stanmore Bay Secondary School.

The school celebrated its 25th Jubilee in 2004.

Both schools are coeducational.

Notes

External links
 Whangaparaoa College website
 Stanmore Bay School website
 Photographs of Stanmore Bay held in Auckland Libraries' heritage collections.

Hibiscus and Bays Local Board Area
Populated places in the Auckland Region
Beaches of the Auckland Region
Hibiscus Coast